Kevin Sandoval may refer to:
 Kevin Sandoval (Guatemalan footballer) (born 1962)
 Kevin Sandoval (Peruvian footballer) (born 1997)